St. Augustine's Church (British English: St Augustin's or St Augustine's) refers to many churches dedicated either to Augustine of Hippo or to Augustine of Canterbury, the first Archbishop of Canterbury.

Australia
St Augustine's Church, Salisbury, South Australia

Austria 
St. Augustine's Church, the official name of the Augustinian Church, Vienna, Austria

Algeria 
Saint Augustin Basilica, Annaba, Algeria

Chile
St. Augustine Cathedral, Talca, Chile

Denmark 
St. Augustine's Church, Copenhagen

Germany 
St. Augustin, Coburg
St. Augustine's Monastery (Erfurt)
Church of St Augustine of Canterbury, Wiesbaden

India
Church of St. Augustine, Goa
St. Augustine's Church, Kulasekharamtaly

Italy
 Sant'Agostino, Rome

Malta 
St Augustine Church, Valletta
Church of St Augustine, Victoria Gozo

New Zealand
St Augustine's Church, Christchurch

Philippines 
Saint Augustine Parish Church (Baliuag)
San Agustin Parish Church (Bay, Laguna)
San Agustin Church (Manila)
St. Augustine Parish Church (Paoay), in Ilocos Norte

Poland
St. Augustine's Church, Warsaw

United Kingdom 
St Augustine Papey, London (demolished)
St Augustine the Less Church, Bristol (demolished 1962)
St Augustine Watling Street, London, England
St Augustine's Abbey, Canterbury, Kent
St Augustin's Church, Bournemouth
St Augustine's Church, Brighton (closed 2002)
St Augustine's Church, Brookland
St Augustine's Church, Broxbourne
St Augustine's Church, Derby
St Augustine's Church, Edgbaston, Birmingham
St Augustine's Church, Even Swindon, Wiltshire, England
St Augustine's Church, Flimwell, East Sussex
St Augustine's Church, Gillingham, Kent
St Augustine's Church, Hedon, East Riding of Yorkshire
St Augustine's Church, Norwich, Norfolk
St Augustine's Church, Penarth, Penarth, Wales
St Augustine's Church, Pendlebury, City of Salford
St Augustine's Church, Ramsgate (Shrine of St Augustine of England), Kent
St Augustine's Church, Rumney
St Augustine's Church, Salisbury
St Augustine's Church, Sookholme
St Augustine's Church, West Monkton, Somerset
St Augustine's Church, Wrangthorn, Leeds
St Augustine's, Kilburn
St Augustine's Church, Slade Green
St Augustine's Church, Whitchurch, Bristol
 St Austin's Church, Stafford
 St Austin's Church, Wakefield

United States 
St. Augustine Cathedral (Bridgeport, Connecticut)
Saint Augustine by the Sea Catholic Church, Hawaii
St. Augustine Church Complex, Covington, Kentucky
St. Augustine Parish (Isle Brevelle) Church, Natchez, Louisiana
St. Augustine Church (New Orleans), Louisiana
St. Augustine's Church (Austin, Minnesota)
St. Augustine's Church (Brooklyn)
St. Augustine's Church (Bronx)
St. Augustine's Church (Manhattan), New York
Church of St. Augustine (Larchmont, New York)
St. Augustine Church (Cincinnati), Ohio
St. Augustine Church (Pittsburgh)
St. Augustine Church (Philadelphia), Pennsylvania
St. Augustine Church (Dallas, South Dakota)
Saint Augustine Church, Montpelier, Vermont
Saint Augustine Church (New Diggings, Wisconsin)
St. Augustine's University Historic Chapel, Raleigh, North Carolina
Saint Augustine Chapel and Cemetery, Boston, Massachusetts
St. Augustine Parish (Hartford, Connecticut)
St. Augustine's Episcopal Church (Gary, Indiana)
St. Augustine's Episcopal Church Complex, Croton-on-Hudson, New York
Cathedral Basilica of St. Augustine, St. Augustine, Florida

See also
Church of St Mary and St Augustine, Stamford, Lincolnshire, England
St Augustine's Tower, Hackney, Hackney, London, England
Cathedral of Saint Augustine (disambiguation)
San Agustin Church (disambiguation)
Saint Augustine (disambiguation)
St Augustine's Abbey (disambiguation)
St. Augustine Catholic Church (disambiguation)
St. Augustine Catholic Church and Cemetery (disambiguation)